First National Bank Building (also known as the Old First and Merchants National Bank Building and BB&T Bank Building) is a historic bank and high-rise office building located at 823 East Main Street in Richmond, Virginia. It was designed by architect Alfred Bossom and built in 1912–1913. It is a 19-story, four bay by five bay, Classical Revival style steel frame building clad in brick, limestone, and granite. The building features rich architectural ornament that follows the Corinthian order both within and without. It was the first high-rise office tower to be built in Richmond. The First & Merchants Bank would eventually become Sovran Bank.

It was listed on the National Register of Historic Places in 1982. It is located in the Main Street Banking Historic District.

See also
List of tallest buildings in Richmond, Virginia

References

External links
 First National Apartments

Commercial buildings on the National Register of Historic Places in Virginia
Neoclassical architecture in Virginia
Skyscrapers in Richmond, Virginia
National Register of Historic Places in Richmond, Virginia
Individually listed contributing properties to historic districts on the National Register in Virginia
1913 establishments in Virginia
Skyscraper office buildings in Virginia
Office buildings completed in 1913